

464001–464100 

|-bgcolor=#f2f2f2
| colspan=4 align=center | 
|}

464101–464200 

|-bgcolor=#f2f2f2
| colspan=4 align=center | 
|}

464201–464300 

|-bgcolor=#f2f2f2
| colspan=4 align=center | 
|}

464301–464400 

|-bgcolor=#f2f2f2
| colspan=4 align=center | 
|}

464401–464500 

|-bgcolor=#f2f2f2
| colspan=4 align=center | 
|}

464501–464600 

|-bgcolor=#f2f2f2
| colspan=4 align=center | 
|}

464601–464700 

|-bgcolor=#f2f2f2
| colspan=4 align=center | 
|}

464701–464800 

|-id=743
| 464743 Stanislavkomárek ||  ||  (born 1958) is a Czech biologist, philosopher, writer and essayist. He has authored more than twenty books. His main focus is the history of biology, the relation between culture and nature, and biological aesthetics. Since 1990 he has served as a professor at Charles University in Prague. || 
|-id=745
| 464745 Péterrózsa ||  || Rózsa Péter (1905–1977) was a Hungarian mathematician and professor at Eötvös Loránd University, best known as the "founding mother of recursion theory". || 
|}

464801–464900 

|-bgcolor=#f2f2f2
| colspan=4 align=center | 
|}

464901–465000 

|-bgcolor=#f2f2f2
| colspan=4 align=center | 
|}

References 

464001-465000